The RD-810 (РД-810) is a Ukrainian liquid propellant rocket engine burning LOX and Kerosene (RG-1) in a staged combustion cycle. It has a single combustion chamber that provides thrust vector control by gimbaling of the nozzle in two axis by +/- 8°. It is being designed in Ukraine by Yuzhnoye Design Bureau for the prospective first stage propulsion of the Mayak rocket family.

The RD-810 as well as the RD-801 are being designed based on the work of the RD-8 vernier and the maintenance and improvement of the RD-120 engines. The RD-810 can be used stand alone on a Mayak or could be used in a module of four called RD-810M to replace the RD-170 on the Zenit.

See also
Mayak – Prospective Ukrainian launch vehicle family for which the RD-810 is being developed.
RD-801 – A smaller engine of the same family designed by Yuzhnoe.
SCE-200 – An Indian rocket engine of equal specifications which might be based on the RD-810 blueprints.
Yuzhnoe Design Bureau – The RD-810 designer bureau.
Yuzhmash – A multi-product machine-building company that's closely related to Yuzhnoe and would manufacture the RD-RD-810.

References

External links
 Yuzhnoye Design Bureau English-language home page

Rocket engines using kerosene propellant
Rocket engines using the staged combustion cycle
Yuzhnoye rocket engines
Yuzhmash rocket engines
Rocket engines of Ukraine